EIght Royal Navy vessels have borne the name HMS Mastiff, named after the mastiff, a type of dog:

  was the mercantile Herald, launched at Hull in 1790 that the Royal Navy purchased in 1797 and fitted as a gun brig (12 guns); she was lost after running aground in 1800.
  was a gun brig (12 guns) launched in 1813, converted to a survey vessel in 1824 and sold 1851.
  was a mortar vessel launched in 1855 but renamed Mortar Vessel 7 later that year; transferred to HM Coastguard in 1846 and renamed Watch Vessel 37.
  was an iron screw third-class gunboat launched in 1871. Converted to a tender in 1890, renamed  in 1914 and was sold in 1931.
  was a  launched in 1914 and sold in 1921.
  was a naval trawler of the  launched in 1938, sunk by a mine in 1939.
 , pennant FY350, was a 1929 Norwegian whaler, Busen 9, hired by the RN for the duration of the war and returned to Norway in December 1945.

Citations

Royal Navy ship names